Thakazhi Sivasankara Pillai (17 April 1912 – 10 April 1999), popularly known as Thakazhi after his place of birth, was an Indian novelist and short story writer of Malayalam literature. He wrote over 30 novels and novellas and over 7 short stories focusing on the lives of the oppressed classes. Known for his works such as Kayar (Coir, 1978) and Chemmeen (Prawns, 1956), Pillai was a recipient of the Padma Bhushan, the third highest Indian civilian award. He was also a recipient of the Jnanpith, India's highest literary award, awarded in 1984 for the novel Kayar.

Biography 
Thakazhi Sivasankara Pillai was born on 17 April 1912 in Thakazhy, a small village in Kuttanad in present-day Alappuzha district of Kerala to Poypallikalathil Sankara Kurup, who was the brother of Guru Kunchu Kurup, a doyen of Kathakali and Aripurathuveettil Parvathy Amma. After early tutoring by his father and Chakkampurathu Kittu Asan, a local teacher, Pillai had his primary education at a local school in Thakazhi and passed 7th standard examination from the English School in Ambalappuzha. Subsequently, he did his high school education, first at a high school in Vaikom and later at a school in Karuvatta, where he had the opportunity to study under Kainikkara Kumara Pillai, who was the headmaster of the school during that period. After passing 10th standard, he moved to Trivandrum and passed the pleader examination from the Government Law College, Thiruvananthapuram. He started his career as a reporter at Kerala Kesari daily but moved to legal career by practising under a lawyer named P. Parameshwaran Pillai at the munsif court of Ambalappuzha. It was during this time, he was attracted by the communist movement and he participated in the functioning of the Sahitya Pravarthaka Sahakarana Sangham (Writers' Cooperative Society). He presided Kerala Sahitya Akademi and was also associated with Sahitya Akademi as a member of its general council.

Pillai married Thekkemuri Chembakasseril Chirakkal Kamalakshy Ammai, affectionately called by him as Katha, in 1934 and the couple had one son and four daughters. He died on 10 April 1999, at the age of 86 (A week before his 87th birthday), survived by his wife, who died on 1 June 2011, and their five children.

Literary career
Pillai, whose works would later earn him the moniker, Kerala Maupassant, started writing at an early age and his associations with Kainikkara Kumara Pillai during his school days and with Kesari Balakrishna Pillai during his Thiruvananthapuram days are known to have helped the aspiring writer in his career, it was the latter who introduced him to European literature. His first short story was Daridran (The Poor) which was published in 1929. In 1934 came out Thakazhi's first published volume, Puthumalar (New Blossoms) which was a collection of short stories. This was soon followed by his first novel Thyagathinu Prathiphalam (Fruits of Sacrifice) which primarily dealt with the social injustices prevalent during that time. This was the first of his 39 novels; he also published 21 anthologies composed of over 600 short stories, two plays and four memoirs.

Pillai's literary works are known to portray the society in Kerala in the mid-20th century. Thottiyude Makan (Scavenger's Son), a story about a scavenger who strives unsuccessfully to keep his son from continuing the family profession was published in 1947 and is known to be the first realistic novel in Malayalam literature. His political novel, Randidangazhi (Two Measures, 1948), projected the evils of the feudal system that prevailed in Kerala then, especially in Kuttanad. The film adaptation, directed and produced by P. Subramaniam from a screenplay by Thakazhi himself, received a certificate of merit at the National Film Awards in 1958.

In 1956, Pillai published his love epic Chemmeen (Prawns), which was a departure from his earlier line of realism and the novel received critical acclaim, becoming the first post-colonial Indian novel to be translated into English; the English translation was accepted into the Indian Series of UNESCO Collection of Representative Works. It told a tragic love story against the backdrop of a fishing village in Alappuzha. The novel and its film adaptation, also titled Chemmeen (1965), earned him national and international fame. Chemmeen was translated into 19 world languages and adapted into film in 15 countries. The film adaptation, directed by Ramu Kariat, won the National Film Award for Best Feature Film in 1965. His next notable work was Enippadikal (Rungs of the Ladder), published in 1964, which traces the careerism of an ambitious bureaucrat whose lust for power and position becomes his own undoing. The novel was adapted into a movie in 1973 by Thoppil Bhasi. Anubhavangal Paalichakal, another novel he published in 1966, was also made into a feature film by K. S. Sethumadhavan, in 1971, with Sathyan, Prem Nazir and Sheela in the lead roles. The story "Vellapokkathil", written in the mid-1960s, is considered one of his best stories. It was adapted into a short film of the same name by Jayaraj in 2007.

Pillai wrote Kayar (Coir) in 1978, a long novel extending to over 1000 pages, covering the history of several generations in Kuttanad for over 200 years and is considered by many as his masterpiece, n spite of the popularity of Chemmeen. The novel deals with hundreds of characters over four generations, bringing back to life an axial period (1885–1971) during which feudalism, matriliny, and bonded labour gave way to conjugal life and to universal access to land ownership, and later, to decolonisation and the industrial revolution of the 1960s.

Pillai wrote his only play in 1946 titled Thottilla, which was a social drama; it was performed on many stages by Kerala People's Arts Club. He published four autobiographical books and two other works. Four of his short stories were the base of a film, Naalu Pennungal, made by Adoor Gopalakrishnan in 2007, which he termed as his homage to the writer.

Awards and honours 

Pillai received the Sahitya Akademi Award in 1957 for the love epic, Chemmeen. Kerala Sahitya Akademi selected Enippadikal for their annual award for novels in 1965. His Novel, Kayar was selected for the Vayalar Award in 1984, and he received the highest Indian literary award, Njanapeedam in 1984 and a year later, the Government of India awarded him the third highest civilian honour of the Padma Bhushan. Sahitya Akademi elected him as a distinguished fellow in 1989; he had already been a distinguished fellow of the Kerala Sahitya Akademi by then. In 1994, the Government of Kerala awarded him Ezhuthachan Puraskaram, their highest literary honour. In 1996 he was conferred with an honorary doctorate (D.Litt) by Mahatma Gandhi University. India Post issued a commemorative postage stamp depicting his image in 2003, under the Jnanapith Award Winners series. Sahitya Akademi commissioned a documentary film on the life of Pillai to be made and M. T. Vasudevan Nair made Thakazhi, a documentary film of 57 minutes length, which was released a year before Pillai's death in 1998. The Government of Kerala acquired Sankaramanagala, the ancestral home of Pillai, in 2000 and a museum, Thakazhi Memorial Museum was set up in 2001, honoring the writer's memory.

Bibliography

Novels

 
 
 
 
 
 
 
 
 
 
 
 
 
 
 
 
 
 
 
 
 
 
 
 
 
 
 
 
 
 
 
 
 
 
 
 
 
 
 
 Susheelan
 Thakazhiyude Lakhunovelukal

Short story anthologies 

 
 
 
 
 
 
 
 
 
 
 
 
 
 
 Inquilab (1952)
 Khoshayathra
 Pativratha (Chaste Wife, 1946)
 Pratheekshakal
 Puthumalar
 Adiyozhukkukal
 Prathijna
 Njarakkangal
 Makalude Makal
 Kanakku Theerkkal
 Aadhyathe Prasavam
 Alinganam
 Charithrasathyangal

Autobiographies 
 
 
 
 Ente Vakeel Jeevitham

Plays

Other works

Translations into other languages

Films 

 Nurayum Pathayum
 Naalu Pennungal
 Chemmeen
 Enippadikal
 Anubhavangal Paalichakal
 Randidangazhi
 Chukku
 Oru Pennum Randaanum

Critical studies on Thakazhi

See also
 Thakazhi (film), a documentary on Thakazhi by M. T. Vasudevan Nair
 Raj Nair

References

Further reading

External links 
 Postage stamp issued –  Thakazhi Sivasankara Pillai

1912 births
1999 deaths
Malayali people
Recipients of the Jnanpith Award
Malayalam-language writers
Malayalam novelists
Malayalam short story writers
Recipients of the Sahitya Akademi Award in Malayalam
Recipients of the Ezhuthachan Award
Recipients of the Kerala Sahitya Akademi Award
Recipients of the Padma Bhushan in literature & education
20th-century Indian short story writers
Indian male novelists
Indian male short story writers
20th-century Indian novelists
People from Alappuzha district
Writers from Kerala
20th-century Indian male writers